William C. McCraw (August 15, 1896 – November 8, 1955) was Dallas County, Texas District Attorney and Attorney General of Texas from 1935 – 1939.

McCraw was elected District Attorney of Dallas County.  When he resigned, he joined his friend Tom C. Clark in forming the law firm of Clark and McCraw.  Clark served as McCraw's campaign manager when he received the Democratic nomination and was elected Attorney General of Texas in 1934.  He served two terms.  During his tenure as Attorney General he petitioned the United States Supreme Court unsuccessfully for Texas to take a share of the estate of Edward Howland Robinson Green who had lived for many years in Terrell, Texas.

In 1938, McCraw ran for Governor as the more conservative candidate against W. Lee "Pappy" O'Daniel, but lost the Democratic Primary.

While he was Attorney General of Texas, McGraw owned and flew an airplane over Texas "as casually as he would drive a car."  Having logged 1800 flying hours, he was called to active duty with the Army Air Corps in World War II.

From 1944 to 1945, McGraw was commanding officer of the Liberty Ship Major General Herbert A. Dargue, as part of the classified project "Ivory Soap." Ivory Soap was a secret project to put aircraft repair shops close to the battlefields of the Pacific.  http://www.usmm.org/felknorivory.html  The ship saw action in Saipan and Iwo Jima. It was credited with shooting down 1 1/2 Betties (Japanese bombers).  Major General Herbert A. Dargue returned from its successful mission to Mobile Alabama on 11-Dec-1945 under the command of Colonel McGraw.

References

Texas Attorneys General
Texas Democrats
Texas lawyers
People from Dallas
1955 deaths
Year of birth uncertain
1896 births
People from Arlington, Texas
20th-century American lawyers